Uno is an unincorporated community located in Madison County, Virginia.

The town of Madison features local hotspots such as Bonanno's Restaurant, Bavarian Chef, and Pig 'N Steak

References
Board of Geographic Names reference

Home of the Steam & Gas Engine Association; Cow Country; Architectural delights; Old wood & rust; Railroad Whistle Stop; Post Office; Wind Power; Flower Scapes; Farms; Mountain Views

Unincorporated communities in Virginia
Unincorporated communities in Madison County, Virginia